Chu Yong-ha (1908 – ?) was a North Korean politician and diplomat. Chu was elected into several posts in the Workers' Party of North Korea, the predecessor of the Workers' Party of Korea, in its early days. Chu was the target of plots ensuing from factional strife within the party. As a member of the Domestic faction, Chu was opposed by the Guerrilla, Soviet and Yan'an factions.

During the Korean War, Chu was North Korea's ambassador to Moscow. After the war, a fictitious plot against Kim Il-sung was "uncovered" in a show trial. Among the claims against the defendants was overthrowing Kim Il-sung and making Pak Hon-yong the new premier, and Chu one of his vice-premiers.

Biography 
Chu was born in 1908.

Chu was part of the Political Committee of the Workers' Party of North Korea that was founded in August 1946 as a compromise between rivaling factions of communists on the orders of the Soviets. Chu represented the Domestic faction in the newly formed party.

In the First Congress of the party on 28–30 August 1946, Chu was elected to the Political Committee (Politburo) of the first Central Committee of the party. On the same occasion, Chu was elected vice-chairman of the Secretariat of the party. Chu presided over the session on 30 August. In addition, Chu was elected vice-chairman of the party, along with Kim Il-sung in the first plenum of the Central Committee on 31 August.

In the Second Congress of the party, 27–30 March 1948, Chu was re-elected to the Political Committee of the second Central Committee. Chu presided over the session on 27 March. Chu was re-elected vice-chairman in a plenum of the second Central Committee on 31 March.
Chu compromised with the Kim Il-sung faction, but remained a supporter of Pak Hon-yong. On September 1948, when the Democratic People's Republic of Korea (North Korea) was officially proclaimed, Chu was appointed to the Minister of Transport in the North Korean Cabinet headed by Premier Kim Il-sung. In the third plenum of the second Central Committee, on 24–25 September 1948, Ho Ka-i replaced Chu as the vice-chairman of the party as well as the chairman of the inspection committee.

The organ of the North Korean government, Minju Choson, criticized Chu for defending former members of the Workers' Party of South Korea who had stayed in the North. Kim Il-sung's Guerrilla faction, together with the Soviet and Yan'an factions, sought to remove Chu as well.

During the Korean War, Chu was the North Korean ambassador to Moscow.

In the show trial of Ri Sung-yop and 12 other defendants in August 1953 just after the end of the Korean War, a fictitious conspiracy was revealed. According to the accusers, the conspirators planned overthrowing Kim Il-sung and making Pak Hon-yong the premier. Chu was to accompany Chang Si-u as Pak's vice-premiers.

See also 

History of the Workers' Party of Korea

References

Works cited 

1908 births
Year of death missing
Place of birth missing
Place of death missing
Ambassadors of North Korea to Russia
Government ministers of North Korea
Vice Chairmen of the Workers' Party of Korea and its predecessors
Members of the 1st Central Committee of the Workers' Party of North Korea
Members of the 2nd Central Committee of the Workers' Party of Korea
Members of the 1st Political Committee of the Workers' Party of North Korea
Members of the 1st Standing Committee of the Workers' Party of North Korea
Members of the 2nd Political Committee of the Workers' Party of Korea
Members of the 2nd Standing Committee of the Workers' Party of Korea
Members of the 1st Supreme People's Assembly